Rebecca and Eleazar is a 1652 oil on canvas painting by Bartolomé Esteban Murillo, now in the Prado Museum in Madrid. It shows a scene from chapter 24 of the Book of Genesis.

References

1652 paintings
Paintings by Bartolomé Esteban Murillo in the Museo del Prado
Paintings depicting figures from the Book of Genesis